Sirindhorn is a district (amphoe) of Ubon Ratchathani province, Thailand, established by the Royal Decree Establishing Amphoe Sirindhorn, BE 2534 (1991), coming into force on 4 January 1992. It was named in the honour of Princess Sirindhorn on the occasion of her 36th birthday.

Creation
The district was created effective 3 January 1992 by splitting off tambon Kham Khuean Kaeo from Khong Chiam and the five tambons, Khan Rai, Chong Mek, Nikhom Sang Ton-eng Lam Dom Noi, Non Ko, and Fang Kham, from Phibun Mangsahan.

Geography
Neighboring districts are (from the south clockwise): Buntharik, Phibun Mangsahan and Khong Chiam. To the west across the Mekong river is the Lao province of Champasak.

The Sirindhorn Dam that dams the Dom Noi River is in this district. There is a border crossing to Laos here—from Chong Mek on the Thai side to Vang Tao on the Lao side, with onward travel typically to Pakxe.

Administration

Central administration 
The district is divided into six subdistricts (tambons), which are further subdivided into 76 administrative villages (mubans).

Local administration 
There are two subdistrict municipalities (thesaban tambons) in the district:
 Chong Mek consisting of parts of subdistrict Chong Mek.
 Nikhom Sang Ton-eng Lam Dom Noi consisting of subdistrict Nikhom Sang Ton-eng Lam Dom Noi.

There are five subdistrict administrative organizations (SAO) in the district:
 Khan Rai consisting of subdistrict Khan Rai.
 Chong Mek consisting of parts of subdistrict Chong Mek.
 Non Ko consisting of subdistrict Non Ko.
 Fang Kham consisting of subdistrict Fang Kham.
 Kham Khuean Kaeo consisting of subdistrict Kham Khuean Kaeo.

References

External links
ubonratchathani.go.th (Thai)
Amphoe.com on Sirindhorn district (Thai)

Sirindhorn
Laos–Thailand border crossings